Zarika Njeri Kanghete (born 13 March 1985), commonly known as Fatuma Zarika, is a Kenyan professional boxer. She held the WBC female super-bantamweight title from 2016 to 2019, becoming the first Kenyan to win a WBC title.

Professional boxing record

References

External links
 

Living people
1985 births
Kenyan women boxers
People from Nairobi
World Boxing Council champions
Bantamweight boxers
Super-bantamweight boxers
Featherweight boxers
Super-featherweight boxers
World super-bantamweight boxing champions
21st-century Kenyan women